The striped caco or striped metal frog (Cacosternum striatum) is a species of frog in the family Pyxicephalidae, found in Lesotho and South Africa, and possibly Mozambique and Eswatini.
Its natural habitats are subtropical or tropical moist shrubland, subtropical or tropical seasonally wet or flooded lowland grassland, subtropical or tropical high-altitude grassland, rivers, and swampland.
It is threatened by habitat loss.

References

Cacosternum
Amphibians of South Africa
Fauna of Lesotho
Taxa named by Vivian Frederick Maynard FitzSimons
Taxonomy articles created by Polbot
Amphibians described in 1947